Derbyshire County Cricket Club in 1930 was the cricket season when the English club Derbyshire had been playing for fifty nine years. It was their thirty-second season in the County Championship and they won seven matches to finish ninth  in the County Championship..

1930 season

Derbyshire played 28 games in the County Championship, and one match against the touring Australians. They lost to the Australians and won seven of their County Championship matches to finish ninth.

Guy Jackson was in his seventh season as captain.  Alf Pope made his first class debut for Derbyshire in the season and went on the play until 1939, making his main contribution as a bowler.  John Gilbert also made his debut and played  occasional games for Derbyshire until 1936.

Harry Storer was top scorer and Tommy Mitchell took most wickets.

Matches

{| class="wikitable" style="width:100%;"
|-
! style="background:#efefef;" colspan="6"| List of  matches
|- style="background:#efefef;"
!No.
!Date
!V
!Result 
!Margin
!Notes
|- 
|1
| 10 May 1930
| Middlesex Lord's Cricket Ground, St John's Wood 
| style="background:#fc0;"|Drawn
|
|  Robins 6-73  
|- 
|2
| 14 May 1930
|  Sussex    County Ground, Derby 
| style="background:#0f0;"|Won
| Innings and 6 runs
|  AG Slater 5-45; Tate 5-45;  T S Worthington 5-35  
|- 
|3
|  21 May 1930
| Australian Queen's Park, Chesterfield
| style="background:#f00;"|Lost
| 10 wickets
|  Ponsford 131; Hornibrook 6-61 and 6-82  
|- 
|4
|  24 May 1930  
|  Northamptonshire County Ground, Derby
| style="background:#f00;"|Lost
| 8 runs
|  Jupp 5–51; T. B. Mitchell 7-25; Thomas 5-46  
|- 
|5
|  28 May 1930
| Kent   Rutland Recreation Ground, Ilkeston
| style="background:#0f0;"|Won
| 199 runs
|  GR Jackson 140; L F Townsend 104; Freeman 9-50; T. B. Mitchell 5-50  
|- 
|6
|  31 May 1930
| Middlesex The Town Ground, Burton-on-Trent 
| style="background:#0f0;"|Won
| 7 wickets
|  L F Townsend 141  
|- 
|7
|  04 Jun 1930  
| Glamorgan    St Helen's, Swansea
| style="background:#f00;"|Lost
| 29 runs
|  DE Davies 5-45; T. B. Mitchell 7-61  
|- 
|8
|  07 Jun 1930  
| Warwickshire  County Ground, Derby
| style="background:#fc0;"|Drawn
|
| H Storer 102; L F Townsend 117; Croom 110; Wyatt 145;  T S Worthington 5-77   
|- 
|9
|  11 Jun 1930  
|  Northamptonshire County Ground, Northampton
| style="background:#0f0;"|Won
| 71 runs
| EW Clark 5-68; T. B. Mitchell 6-28   
|- 
|10
|  14 Jun 1930
| Kent   Angel Ground, Tonbridge
| style="background:#f00;"|Lost
| 9 wickets
| Freeman 8-70 and 5-40   
|- 
|11
|  18 Jun 1930
|  Sussex    Cricket Field Road Ground, Horsham
| style="background:#f00;"|Lost
| Innings and 34 runs
|  Wensley 120; Bowley 5-63  
|- 
|12
|  21 Jun 1930
| Somerset Queen's Park, Chesterfield
| style="background:#0f0;"|Won
| 10 wickets
|  AG Slater 7-31 and 7-17  
|- 
|13
|  25 Jun 1930  
| Leicestershire Aylestone Road, Leicester
| style="background:#fc0;"|Drawn
|
|  Berry 110; T. B. Mitchell 5-119  
|- 
|14
|  28 Jun 1930  
|  Nottinghamshire  Rutland Recreation Ground, Ilkeston
| style="background:#fc0;"|Drawn
|
| L F Townsend 6-86   
|- 
|15
|  02 Jul 1930
|  SurreyCounty Ground, Derby 
| style="background:#fc0;"|Drawn
|
|    
|- 
|16
|  05 Jul 1930  
| Worcestershire  Queen's Park, Chesterfield 
| style="background:#0f0;"|Won
| Innings and 13 runs
| H Storer 132; T. B. Mitchell 5-87; AG Slater 8-46   
|- 
|17
|  12 Jul 1930  
|  Nottinghamshire  Trent Bridge, Nottingham 
| style="background:#fc0;"|Drawn
|
|  D Smith 105; A Staples 5-75  
|- 
|18
|  19 Jul 1930  
| Yorkshire   Queen's Park, Chesterfield
|Abandoned
|
|    
|- 
|19
|  23 Jul 1930
|  SurreyKennington Oval
| style="background:#0f0;"|Won
| 199 runs
| D Smith 107; L F Townsend 102; Shepherd 5-42; T. B. Mitchell 5-40; AG Slater 5-46   
|- 
|20
|  26 Jul 1930  
| Essex County Ground, Leyton
| style="background:#fc0;"|Drawn
|
| H Storer 123; HTO Smith 6-56   
|- 
|21
|  30 Jul 1930  
| Leicestershire Park Road Ground, Buxton 
| style="background:#fc0;"|Drawn
|
| AG Slater 5-36   
|- 
|22
|  02 Aug 1930  
| Warwickshire  Edgbaston, Birmingham
| style="background:#fc0;"|Drawn
|
|    
|- 
|23
|  06 Aug 1930  
| Worcestershire  Chester Road North Ground, Kidderminster
| style="background:#f00;"|Lost
| Innings and 38 runs
|  Brook 6-30; T. B. Mitchell 5-74  
|- 
|24
| 09 Aug 1930  
| Yorkshire   Headingley, Leeds 
| style="background:#fc0;"|Drawn
|
| Leyland 186; T. B. Mitchell 5-92; Verity 5-32   
|- 
|25
|  16 Aug 1930  
| Glamorgan    County Ground, Derby
| style="background:#f00;"|Lost
| 165 runs
| Turnbull 135; Ryan 6-86 and 6-27; T. B. Mitchell 5-64   
|- 
|26
|  20 Aug 1930  
| Gloucestershire  Queen's Park, Chesterfield
| style="background:#fc0;"|Drawn
|
|  Goddard 5-71;AG Slater 5-84; Parker 6-60  
|- 
|27
|  23 Aug 1930  
| Essex County Ground, Derby 
| style="background:#fc0;"|Drawn
|
| Cutmore 122; O'Connor 101; H Storer 100; T. B. Mitchell 7-109   
|- 
|28
|  27 Aug 1930
| Somerset County Ground, Taunton
| style="background:#f00;"|Lost
| 203 runs
| Longrigg 108; T. B. Mitchell 6-79; JC White 5-69; Young 8-30   
|- 
|29
|  30 Aug 1930  
| Gloucestershire  Fry's Ground, Bristol 
| style="background:#f00;"|Lost
| 8 wickets
| L F Townsend 7-57; Parker 8-62   
|-

Statistics

County Championship batting averages

(a) Figures adjusted for non CC matches

County Championship bowling averages

Wicket keeping

Harry Elliott Catches 37  Stumping 19

See also
Derbyshire County Cricket Club seasons
1930 English cricket season

References

1930 in English cricket
English cricket seasons in the 20th century
Derbyshire County Cricket Club seasons